Whenever I Seem to Be Far Away is the fourth solo album by Norwegian jazz guitarist Terje Rypdal recorded in 1974 and released on the ECM label.

Reception
The Allmusic review awarded the album 2 stars.

Track listing
All compositions by Terje Rypdal
 "Silver Bird is Heading for the Sun" - 14:05 
 "The Hunt" - 5:18 
 "Whenever I Seem to Be Far Away" - 17:37 
Recorded at the Arne Bendiksen Studio in Oslo, Norway (track 1 & 2) and at Tonstudio Bauer in Ludwigsburg, West Germany (track 3) in 1974

Personnel
Terje Rypdal — guitar, electric guitar
Sveinung Hovensjø — 6 string bass, electric bass (tracks 1 & 2)
Pete Knutsen — mellotron, electric piano (tracks 1 & 2)
Odd Ulleberg — French horn (tracks 1 & 2)
Jon Christensen — percussion (tracks 1 & 2)
Südfunk Symphony Orchestra conducted by Mladen Gutesha (track 3)

References

ECM Records albums
Terje Rypdal albums
1974 albums
Albums produced by Manfred Eicher